Sharon Dahlonega Bush (born Sharon Daisy Raiford) is an American television newscaster and print journalist. She was born in Greensboro, North Carolina, and resides in Los Angeles, California. She was an executive producer of the 1985 National Blues Music Awards.

Education
Bush studied philosophy at North Carolina A&T State University. She later studied at the University of Detroit, the US Naval Air Technical Training Command and Georgia State University at Atlanta.

Career
Bush became American television's first African-American female weather anchor of primetime news in 1975 at WGPR-TV, the world's first black-owned-and-operated television station.

Sharon Crews (as she was then known) later anchored news and weather at CBS and NBC network affiliates in North Carolina and Tennessee, respectively, before becoming an Atlanta, Georgia, correspondent and executive producer for Black Entertainment Television.

Bush worked as a morning news anchor at WGHP-TV, the then-ABC affiliate in High Point, North Carolina. She was an executive producer of the 1985 National Blues Music Awards.

Personal life
Bush is married to Grand L. Bush.

References

Living people
African-American television personalities
American television news anchors
Weather presenters
Georgia State University alumni
University of Detroit Mercy alumni
Writers from Greensboro, North Carolina
African-American women journalists
African-American journalists
American women television journalists
Year of birth missing (living people)
21st-century African-American people
21st-century African-American women